Yun Ki-hyeon (born September 19, 1942) is a Korean former Go player. He won the Guksu title twice, in 1971–1972. He resigned as a professional Go player in 2009 due to a controversy and lawsuit over valuable Go boards which Yun sold.

References

External links
Yun Kihyeon's player profile at GoGameWorld
Korea Baduk Association profile (in Korean)

1942 births
Living people
South Korean Go players
Place of birth missing (living people)